Eburneana scharffi is a species of jumping spider in the genus Eburneana that mimics ants. Found in Tanzania, the spider was first described in 2001. The female has a distinctive pattern on its abdomen formed by white hairs. It is the type species of the genus.

Taxonomy
Eburneana scharffi is a species of jumping spider that was first named by Wanda Wesołowska and Tamás Szűts in 2001. It is the type species of the genus Eburneana, one of many of spiders that mimic ants. The genus is named for Litus Eburneum, the Latin name for Ivory Coast, the place where one of the members of the genus, Eburneana magna was first found. The species is named in honour of Nikolaj Scharff, the curator of Arachnida at the Zoological Muse­um at the University in Copenhagen. It is one of over 500 species identified by Wesołowska. In 2015, the genus was added to the subclade Saltafresia in the clade Salticoida based on the analysis of 8 genes. In 2017, it was added to the supergroup Hylloida by Jerzy Prószyński based on a description of this species.

Description
A large ant-like spider, Eburneana scharffi has a flat and slender body. The female has a series of light patches on its abdomen made from short white hairs that form a distinguishing pattern. The carapace is covered with grey hairs.

The spider is distinguished from other members of genus by the four nipple-like shapes on its spinneret. The male has a particularly long and slender embolus, while the pattern on the abdomen of the female makes it easy to tell apart. Compared to the male Eburneana wandae specifically, the spider can be identified by the swollen tibia in the front leg and more robust chelicerae. It shares some similarities with other ant-mimicking jumping spiders, particularly the males that have front legs that are similar to members of the family Pelleninae.

Distribution
Eburneana scharffi is the only member of the genus that is endemic to Tanzania. The holotype was found in the Usambara Mountains but the species has been found at a number of other locations around the country, including the Kazimzubwe Forest Reserve in the Kisarawe District and the Namakut­ wa-Nyamuete Forest Reserve in the Rufiji District. A juvenile member of the species was found in the Mkomazi National Park in 2000, only later recognised as an example of the species.

Citations

Bibliography

Endemic fauna of Tanzania
Salticidae
Spiders of Africa
Spiders described in 2001
Taxa named by Wanda Wesołowska